Fábio Luiz de Jesus Magalhães (born 13 March 1979 in Marataízes) is a male beach volleyball player from Brazil.

Magalhães won the gold medal in the men's beach team competition at the 2005 Beach Volleyball World Championships in Berlin, Germany, and the silver medal at 2008 Summer Olympics in Beijing, China, partnering with Márcio Araújo.

See also 
 Beach volleyball at the 2008 Summer Olympics – Men's tournament
 Brazil at the 2008 Summer Olympics

References

External links
 
 
 
 

1979 births
Living people
Brazilian men's beach volleyball players
Beach volleyball players at the 2008 Summer Olympics
Olympic beach volleyball players of Brazil
Olympic silver medalists for Brazil
Olympic medalists in beach volleyball
Medalists at the 2008 Summer Olympics
Beach volleyball blockers
21st-century Brazilian people